

Beebdroid is a free software emulator for the BBC Micro, based on B-Em for Linux by Tom Walker. It runs under Android and was developed by Reuben Scratton and Kenton Price and released  by Little Fluffy Toys in 2011.

Features 
It features a full onscreen keyboard, optimised controls for the Xperia Play smartphone/console, access to games via disk images provided by stairwaytohell.com and caters for saved games.

Popular titles 
The Google Analytics service led to publication of a list of popular game titles downloaded by users of the emulator.

References

External links 

Official app site

Android emulation software